The Stage Coaches Act 1790 (30 Geo. 3 c. 36) was an Act of Parliament of the Parliament of Great Britain to regulate the use of stagecoaches. The Act built upon the provisions of the Stage Coaches Act 1788, reducing the permitted number of passengers, clarifying the type of vehicles to which it applied, and providing a simplified method for collecting the fines. It came into force from 29 September 1790. It stipulated that no more than four people were permitted to ride upon the roof, and no more than one (other than the driver) upon the box, of any coach or carriage of three or more horses travelling for hire. Any coach or carriage of less than three horses travelling for hire had the limit set at one on the box and three on the roof, although four on the roof were permitted if the coach did not go more than 25 miles from the Post Office in London. If a coach exceeded these limits, the driver was to pay five shillings per each excess person to the collector of the tolls at each turnpike-gate through which they passed. Letting down or picking up people in order to evade the 5s penalty was punishable by imprisonment of the driver for fourteen days to one month. The Act also required that the name of the proprietor of each stagecoach (except mail coaches) be painted legibly on their side door. A coachman who allowed anyone else to drive his coach without the consent of the passengers, or who overturned the carriage or endangered the passengers or their property via misconduct, was to be fined between forty shillings and four pounds; and a guard who fired off his weapons whilst with the coach, other than in defence, was to be fined twenty shillings.

The Act was repealed by section 1 of the Act 50 Geo.3 c.48.

References
The annual register, or, A view of the history, politics and literature for the year 1790. London, 1802. pp. 274–275.

Great Britain Acts of Parliament 1790
Repealed Great Britain Acts of Parliament
Road transport in the United Kingdom
Transport law in the United Kingdom
History of transport in the United Kingdom
1790 in transport
Transport legislation